The 2016 IIHF Ice Hockey U20 World Championship Division II were the two international ice hockey tournaments organized by the International Ice Hockey Federation. Division II A was contested in Elektrėnai, Lithuania and Division II B in Novi Sad, Serbia. These tournaments represent the fourth and fifth tiers of the World Junior Ice Hockey Championships.

Division II A
The Division II A tournament was played in Elektrėnai, Lithuania, from 13 to 19 December 2015.

Participants

Final standings

Results
All times are local (UTC+2).

Statistics

Top 10 scorers

Goaltending leaders
(minimum 40% team's total ice time)

Awards

Best Players Selected by the Directorate
 Goaltender:  Artur Pavliukov
 Defenceman:  Domanatas Cypas
 Forward:  Vilmos Gallo

Division II B
The Division II B tournament was played in Novi Sad, Serbia, from 17 to 23 January 2016.

Participants

Standings

Results
All times are local (UTC+1).

Statistics

Top 10 scorers

Goaltending leaders
(minimum 40% team's total ice time)

Awards

Best Players Selected by the Directorate
 Goaltender:  Ignacio Garcia
 Defenceman:  Stefan Boskovic
 Forward:  Pablo Pantoja

References

External links
IIHF.com

II
2016
International ice hockey competitions hosted by Lithuania
International ice hockey competitions hosted by Serbia
World
World
Sport in Elektrėnai
Sports competitions in Novi Sad
December 2015 sports events in Europe
January 2016 sports events in Europe
21st century in Novi Sad